The 1976 Pro Bowl was the NFL's 26th annual all-star game which featured the outstanding performers from the 1975 season. The game was played on Monday night, January 26, 1976, at the new Louisiana Superdome in New Orleans, Louisiana, with 32,108 in attendance. The final score was NFC 23, AFC 20.  It was also the first Pro Bowl game played indoors.

The game featured the best players in the National Football League as selected by the league's coaches. John Madden of the Oakland Raiders led the AFC team against an NFC team led by Los Angeles Rams head coach Chuck Knox.

The AFC's Billy "White Shoes" Johnson was named the game's MVP on the strength of a 90-yard punt return touchdown and a second punt return of 55 yards that set up a field goal. The referee was Fred Silva.

Players on the winning NFC team received $2,000 apiece while the AFC participants each took home $1,500.

Rosters
The 40-man Pro Bowl squads consisted of the following players:

Offense

Defense

Special teams

Roster Notes:
bold denotes player who participated in game
Injured player; selected but did not play
Replacement selection due to injury or vacancy

Number of selections by team
Note: these numbers include players selected to the team but unable to play as well as replacements for these injured players, so there are more than 40 players in each conference.

References

Pro Bowl
Pro Bowl
Pro Bowl
Pro Bowl
Football, American
January 1976 sports events in the United States